Dendera Temple complex (Ancient Egyptian: Iunet or Tantere; the 19th-century English spelling in most sources, including Belzoni, was Tentyra; also spelled Denderah) is located about  south-east of Dendera, Egypt. It is one of the best-preserved temple complexes of ancient Egypt. The area was used as the sixth nome of Upper Egypt, south of Abydos.

Description

The whole complex covers some 40,000 square meters and is surrounded by a hefty mudbrick enclosed wall. Dendera was inhabited in prehistory, a useful oasis on the banks of the Nile. It seems that pharaoh Pepi I (ca. 2250 BC) built on this site and evidence exists of a temple in the Eighteenth Dynasty (ca 1500 BC). The earliest extant building in the compound today is the mammisi raised by Nectanebo II – last of the native pharaohs (360–343 BC). The features in the complex include: 
 Hathor temple (the main temple)
 Temple of the birth of Isis
 Sacred Lake
 Sanatorium
 Mammisi of Nectanebo II
 Christian Basilica
 Roman Mammisi
 a Barque shrine
 Gateways of Domitian and Trajan
 the Roman Kiosk

Nearby is the Dendera necropolis, a series of mastaba tombs. The necropolis dates from the Early Dynastic Period of the Old Kingdom to the First Intermediate Period of Egypt. The necropolis runs the eastern edge of the western hill and over the northern plain.

Hathor temple

The dominant building in the complex is the Temple of Hathor. The temple has been modified on the same site starting as far back as the Middle Kingdom, and continuing right up until the time of the Roman emperor Trajan. The existing structure began construction in the late Ptolemaic period at the time of Ptolemy Auletes in July 54 BCE. and the hypostyle hall was built in the Roman period under Tiberius.

In Egypt, Trajan was quite active in constructing buildings and decorating them. He appears, together with Domitian, in offering scenes on the propylon of the Temple of Hathor. His cartouche also appears in the column shafts of the Temple of Khnum at Esna.

Layout elements of the temple are:
 Large Hypostyle Hall
 Small Hypostyle Hall
 Laboratory
 Storage magazine
 Offering entry
 Treasury
 Exit to well
 Access to stairwell
 Offering hall
 Hall of the Ennead
 Great Seat and main sanctuary
 Shrine of the Nome of Dendera
 Shrine of Isis
 Shrine of Sokar
 Shrine of Harsomtus
 Shrine of Hathor's Sistrum
 Shrine of gods of Lower Egypt
 Shrine of Hathor
 Shrine of the throne of Rê
 Shrine of Rê
 Shrine of Menat collar
 Shrine of Ihy
 The Pure Place
 Court of the First Feast
 Passage
 Staircase to roof

Depictions of Cleopatra VI which appear on temple walls are good examples of Ptolemaic Egyptian art. On the rear of the temple exterior is a carving of Cleopatra VII Philopator (the popularly well known Cleopatra) and her son, Ptolemy XV Philopator Philometor Caesar (Caesarion), who was fathered by Julius Caesar.

Dendera zodiac

The sculptured Dendera zodiac (or Denderah zodiac) is a widely known relief found in a late Greco-Roman temple, containing images of Taurus (the bull) and the Libra (the balance). A sketch was made of it during the Napoleonic campaign in Egypt. In 1820 it was removed from the temple ceiling by French colonizers and replaced with a fake. There is controversy as to whether they were granted permission by Egypt's ruler, Muhammad Ali Pasha, to do so, or whether they stole it. The real one is now in the Louvre. Champollion's guess that it was Ptolemaic proved to be correct, and Egyptologists now date it to the first century BC.

Crypts
The subterranean Hathor temple tombs total twelve chambers. Some reliefs are dated to as late as the reign of Ptolemy XII Auletes. The crypts reportedly were used for storing vessels and divine iconography. An opening in the "Flame Room" floor leads to a narrow chamber with representations on the walls of the objects which were kept in them. In the second chamber, a relief depicts Pepi I offering a statuette of the god Ihy to four images of Hathor. In the crypt, reached from the "throne room", Ptolemy XII has jewelry and offerings for the gods.

The Dendera light

The Hathor Temple has stone reliefs that depict Harsomtus, in the form of a snake, emerging from a lotus flower. In six reliefs he is shown within an oval container called hn, which might represent the womb of Nut. These resemble a lamp or light.

Restoration work
The Supreme Council of Antiquities began the project of restoration and maintenance of the temple in 2005, stopped in 2011, and then resumed in 2017, after the completion of the necessary scientific and archaeological studies along with careful experimental studies using the best methods and modern techniques. As of March 2021, the second phase of the restoration has been completed, which includes cleaning of the Great Pillars Hall and restoring the original colors and clarity of painted scenes on walls and ceilings. More activity continues at the temple, including a cooperative effort started in 2019 with the French Archaeological delegation, to turn the temple courtyard into an open museum.

Roman mammisi

The Roman mammisi is a subsidiary building dating to the reigns of Trajan and Marcus Aurelius. Numerous reliefs of Trajan making offerings to Egyptian deities can be seen.

Tourism
The Dendera complex has long been one of the most tourist-accessible ancient Egyptian places of worship. It used to be possible to visit virtually every part of the complex, from the crypts to the roof. However, the highest part of the roof of Hathor temple has been closed since 2003. The second stage of the roof was closed in November 2004, after a tourist got too close to the edge and fell to her death on the bedrock below.

Gallery

See also
 Esna temple (in Esna)
 List of Ancient Egyptian sites
 Tomb of Meni
 Tomb of Nyibunesu

References

Further reading

 Jed Z. Buchwald, "Egyptian Stars under Paris Skies". pr.caltech.edu.
 R. A. Parker, "Ancient Egyptian Astronomy". Philosophical Transactions of the Royal Society of London. Series A, Mathematical and Physical Sciences, Vol. 276, No. 1257, The Place of Astronomy in the Ancient World (May 2, 1974), pp. 51–65
 Marshall Clagett, "Ancient Egyptian Science: A Source Book".  Diane, 1989. 
 William Henry and Davenport Adams "Egypt Past and Present: Described and Illustrated". T. Nelson and Sons, 1885. 380 pages. Page 218 - 226
 The Dendera Reliefs, Catchpenny Mysteries.
 Frank Dörnenburg, Electric lights in Egypt?. 2004. (ed. An analysis of how the Egyptians didn't have electricity).
 Mariette, Auguste, Dendérah, Bookshop A. Franck, Paris, 1875.
 Fischer, H.G., Dendera in the third millennium B.C. down to the theban domination of upper Egypt, J.J. Augustin publisher, New York, 1968.

External links

 Dendera Temple complex. satellite-sightseer.com.
 Dendera (French)
 High-resolution Images of Dendera Temple Ceiling

Archaeological sites in Egypt
Egyptian temples
Former religious buildings and structures in Egypt
1st-century BC religious buildings and structures
Hellenistic architecture
23rd-century BC establishments
Buildings and structures completed in the 23rd century BC
Hathor